The 2011–12 VfB Stuttgart season was the 119th season in the club's football history. They competed in the Bundesliga, the top tier of German football, in which they finished 6th as well as competing in the DFB-Pokal, where they were eliminated in the quarter-finals. It was Stuttgart's 35th consecutive season in the league, since having been promoted from the 2. Bundesliga in 1977.

Season summary
Stuttgart finished 6th in Bundesliga, and as a result, qualified for the Europa League. They were eliminated in the quarter-finals of the DFB-Pokal by Bayern Munich.

Players

First-team squad
Squad at end of season

Left club during season

Competitions

Overview

Bundesliga

League table

DFB-Pokal

Sources

Notes

VfB Stuttgart seasons
VfB Stuttgart